Mariusz Gancarczyk (born 5 November 1988 in Ruda Śląska) is a Polish professional footballer who plays as a defender for Szombierki Bytom.

Career
He is a trainee of Wawel Wirek.

References

External links
 

Living people
1988 births
Polish footballers
Sportspeople from Ruda Śląska
Association football defenders
Poland under-21 international footballers
Górnik Zabrze players
KS ROW 1964 Rybnik players
Szombierki Bytom players
Ekstraklasa players
I liga players
III liga players
IV liga players